Concerning Ayyavazhi (a henotheistic belief that originated in South India), the fourth aeon was called Kretha Yukam, according to Ayyavazhi mythology. The third fragment of Kroni was, again, made into two siblings called Suraparppan and Sinkamuka Suran, and they were given responsibility to rule the earth. The wicked rulers began to crush the Thevarkal, who again reported it to Mayon. The Mayon took the form of Arumukan, the Tamil god, and advised the rulers to desist from their wickedness. But, when they spurned the advice arrogantly, Arumukan eliminated them too. During the same Yukam, Suraparppan was created again as Iraniyan. Mayon, incarnated as the son of Iraniyan, and challenged his authority, and finally taking on the therianthropic form of man and lion by piercing his stomach. In the death-bed Mayon asked him to repent. But he replied, arrogantly, that you cannot kill me only by placing ten mountains as ten nails you killed me and otherwise you can't.

See also
Satya Yuga
List of Ayyavazhi-related articles

Ayyavazhi mythology
Eight Yugas